The 2022 French Open was a Grand Slam tennis tournament played on outdoor clay courts. It was held at the Stade Roland Garros in Paris, France, from 22 May to 5 June 2022, comprising singles, doubles and mixed doubles play. Junior and wheelchair tournaments are also scheduled. Novak Djokovic was the defending champion in men's singles, and Barbora Krejčíková was the defending champion in the women's singles. Neither successfully defended their title, with Djokovic losing in the quarter-finals to Rafael Nadal, and Krejčíková losing in the first round to Diane Parry.

The event returned to its full spectator capacity after the last two editions due to COVID-19 restrictions in France. It was the 126th edition of the French Open and the second Grand Slam event of 2022. The main singles draws included 16 qualifiers for men and 16 for women out of 128 players in each draw. It was part of the 2022 ATP Tour and the 2022 WTA Tour. It was also the first edition of the tournament to feature a super tie break in the final set where the player would win first to ten points as rules are now applied in Wimbledon and US Open.

This was the first Grand Slam tournament since the international governing bodies of tennis allowed players from Russia and Belarus to continue to participate in tennis events, but not compete under the name or flags of Russia and Belarus until further notice, due to the 2022 Russian invasion of Ukraine.

The men's singles title was won for the 14th time by Rafael Nadal, who won his 22nd Grand Slam title. He defeated eighth seed Casper Ruud, who was playing his first grand slam final, in straight sets. In winning the title, Nadal extended his record of most titles per tournament at the French Open, and also extended his all-time men's record of major singles titles to 22. The women's singles title was won by Iga Świątek, who won her second French Open and second grand slam title, having won her first at the 2020 French Open. She defeated 18th seed Coco Gauff, who was also playing her first grand slam final, in straight sets. In winning the title, Świątek became the youngest winner of multiple majors since Maria Sharapova's win at the 2006 US Open.

Singles players 
Men's singles

Women's singles

Events

Men's singles

  Rafael Nadal def.  Casper Ruud, 6–3, 6–3, 6–0

Women's singles

  Iga Świątek def.  Coco Gauff, 6–1, 6–3

Men's doubles

  Marcelo Arévalo /  Jean-Julien Rojer def.  Ivan Dodig /  Austin Krajicek, 6–7(4–7), 7–6(7–5), 6–3

Women's doubles

  Caroline Garcia /  Kristina Mladenovic def.  Coco Gauff /  Jessica Pegula 2–6, 6–3, 6–2

Mixed doubles

  Ena Shibahara /  Wesley Koolhof def.  Ulrikke Eikeri /  Joran Vliegen, 7–6(7–5), 6–2

Wheelchair men's singles

  Shingo Kunieda def.  Gustavo Fernández, 6–2, 5–7, 7–5

Wheelchair women's singles

  Diede de Groot def.  Yui Kamiji, 6–4, 6–1

Wheelchair quad singles

 Niels Vink def.  Sam Schröder, 6–4, 7–6(10–8)

Wheelchair men's doubles

  Alfie Hewett /  Gordon Reid def.  Gustavo Fernández /  Shingo Kunieda, 7–6(7–5), 7–6(7–5)

Wheelchair women's doubles

  Diede de Groot /  Aniek van Koot def.  Yui Kamiji /  Kgothatso Montjane, 7–6(7–5), 1–6, [10–8]

Wheelchair quad doubles 

   Sam Schröder /  Niels Vink def.  Heath Davidson /  Ymanitu Silva, 6–2, 6–2

Boys' singles

  Gabriel Debru def.  Gilles-Arnaud Bailly, 7–6(7–5), 6–3

Girls' singles

  Lucie Havlíčková def.  Solana Sierra, 6–3, 6–3

Boys' doubles

  Edas Butvilas /  Mili Poljičak def.  Gonzalo Bueno /  Ignacio Buse, 6–4, 6–0

Girls' doubles

  Sára Bejlek /  Lucie Havlíčková def.  Nikola Bartůňková /  Céline Naef, 6–3, 6–3

Men's legends doubles

  Arnaud Clément /  Fabrice Santoro def.  Sébastien Grosjean /  Cédric Pioline, 6–3, 4–6, [10–7]

Women's legends doubles

  Flavia Pennetta /  Francesca Schiavone def.  Gisela Dulko /  Gabriela Sabatini, 1–6, 7–6(7–4), [10–6]

Point distribution and prize money

Point distribution
As a Grand Slam tournament, the points for the French Open are the highest of all ATP and WTA tournaments. These points determine the world ATP and WTA rankings for men's and women's competition, respectively. In both singles and doubles, women received slightly higher point totals compared to their male counterparts at each round of the tournament, except for the first and last. Points and rankings for the wheelchair events fall under the jurisdiction of the ITF Wheelchair Tennis Tour, which also places Grand Slams as the highest classification.

Below is a series of tables for each of the competitions showing the ranking points on offer for each event:

Senior events

Wheelchair Events

Prize money

References

External links

 

 
2022 ATP Tour
2022 WTA Tour
2022 in French sport
2022 in Paris
Sports events affected by the 2022 Russian invasion of Ukraine